Stefan Effenberg (born 2 August 1968) is a German former footballer who most recently acted as sporting director for KFC Uerdingen 05. A midfielder, he was known for his leadership skills, passing range, shooting ability, and physical strength, but was also a temperamental and controversial character.

In the Bundesliga alone – where he represented Bayern Munich most notably, in six seasons and in two different spells – Effenberg collected 109 yellow cards, an all-time record at the time of his retirement. With Bayern, he won three Bundesligas and captained the club to the UEFA Champions League title in 2001.

In a career which was cut short after a run-in with the management, he played for Germany on more than 30 occasions, representing the nation in one World Cup and one European Championship. His nickname is Der Tiger ("the tiger").

Club career
Born and raised in Niendorf, Hamburg on 2 August 1968, Stefan Effenberg started his professional career with Borussia Mönchengladbach, where he became an undisputed first-choice by the age of 20. This attracted the interest of Bundesliga giants FC Bayern Munich, where he scored 19 goals in his first two seasons after his transfer, although the club failed to win any silverware with Effenberg in the lineup.

When legendary Lothar Matthäus (who also represented Mönchengladbach) returned to Bayern in 1992, Effenberg moved to ACF Fiorentina. Despite the presence of Dane Brian Laudrup and Argentine Gabriel Batistuta, Fiorentina was relegated from Serie A in his first season. Effenberg stayed on in the second flight, winning promotion back at the first attempt.

In the summer of 1994, Effenberg then moved back to Gladbach, where he appeared in 118 league matches, scoring 23 goals, before Bayern re-signed him in 1998. Effenberg's second spell with the Bavarians was much more successful. He collected three Bundesliga titles in a row, and Bayern also reached two UEFA Champions League finals, the first of which was a 1–2 defeat to Manchester United F.C. in 1999. Bayern returned to the final in 2001 with Effenberg as captain. He scored Bayern's equalising goal from the penalty spot in a victory against Valencia (1–1, penalty shootout win). After the final, Effenberg was named the Most Valuable Player of the 2000–01 UEFA Champions League. After his departure, club fans voted him one of the eleven greatest Bayern players of all time.

After an unassuming spell at VfL Wolfsburg, Effenberg ended his career in Qatar with Al-Arabi Sports Club, with Gabriel Batistuta as his teammate. He appeared occasionally as a color commentator for German TV after his retirement as a player.

Managerial career
Effenberg was appointed as the head coach of SC Paderborn on 13 October 2015. He was sacked on 3 March 2016.

On 10 October 2019, KFC Uerdingen 05 presented Effenberg as the new sporting director. Following a few troubled months which included the team briefly staying at an Italian hotel with no football pitch for a mid-season training camp, he stepped back from this position prematurely in May 2020.

International career
Effenberg played 35 games for the Germany national team and scored five goals. His debut came on 5 June 1991, in a Euro 1992 qualifier against Wales, as he played the last 18 minutes of a 1–0 away loss. He would be an everpresent fixture during the final stages, even netting in the second group stage match, a 2–0 win over Scotland.

During a group game against South Korea in the 1994 FIFA World Cup. Effenberg "gave the finger" to German fans at the Cotton Bowl in the 35 °C (95 °F) heat of Dallas when he got substituted after a subpar performance; the Germans were then only one goal up, after leading 3–0. German coach Berti Vogts was so outraged by this incident that he dropped Effenberg from the team on the spot, and declared that he was finished as an international player.

Effenberg did not appear in another international match again until 1998, when he was briefly re-instated to the national team for a couple of friendly matches in Malta in September, which happened to be Vogts' last two matches as national team coach. They turned out to be his last caps for Germany.

Controversies and personal life
Effenberg had a history of attracting attention and ire from fans and other players alike with his behaviour. In 1991, prior to a UEFA Cup game against then-semi-professional Cork City, Effenberg told the press he was sure of a victory, saying Cork City midfielder Dave Barry was "like (his) grandfather". Barry got his retribution by scoring the opening goal in the team's 1–1 draw at Musgrave Park.

In the late 1990s, Effenberg was rarely out of the tabloids, especially when he left his wife Martina and revealed an affair with Claudia Strunz, who at that time was the wife of former teammate Thomas Strunz. Later, Effenberg published a controversial autobiography, notorious for its blatant contents – which included lashing out at some other football professionals, namely club and national side mate Lothar Matthäus.

In 2001, Effenberg was fined after being found guilty of assaulting a woman in a nightclub. The following year, he implied that unemployed people in Germany were in fact too lazy to look for work, and demanded they took benefit cuts. The interview was issued in Playboy.

Strunz and Effenberg were married in 2004, and the player also had three children from his first marriage; the couple then relocated to Florida.

Career statistics

Club

International

Scores and results list Germany's goal tally first, score column indicates score after each Effenberg goal.

Managerial

Honours
Bayern Munich
 Bundesliga: 1998–99, 1999–2000, 2000–01
 DFB-Pokal: 1999–2000
 UEFA Champions League: 2000–01
 Intercontinental Cup: 2001
 DFL-Supercup: 1990
 DFB-Ligapokal: 1998, 1999, 2000

Fiorentina
 Serie B: 1993–94

Borussia Mönchengladbach
 DFB-Pokal: 1994–95

Germany
 UEFA European Championship runner-up: 1992
 U.S. Cup: 1993

Individual
 kicker Bundesliga Team of the Season: 1990–91, 1991–92, 1994–95, 1995–96, 1996–97, 1997–98, 1999–2000
 UEFA European Championship Team of the Tournament: 1992
 FIFA XI: 1997
 ESM Team of the Year: 1998–99
 UEFA Club Footballer of the Year: 2001
 Bayern Munich All-time XI

References

External links
 
 
 

1968 births
Living people
Footballers from Hamburg
German footballers
Bundesliga players
Association football midfielders
SC Victoria Hamburg players
Borussia Mönchengladbach players
FC Bayern Munich footballers
VfL Wolfsburg players
Serie A players
Serie B players
ACF Fiorentina players
Al-Arabi SC (Qatar) players
Germany under-21 international footballers
Germany international footballers
UEFA Euro 1992 players
1994 FIFA World Cup players
German expatriate footballers
Expatriate footballers in Italy
Expatriate footballers in Qatar
German expatriate sportspeople in Italy
Qatar Stars League players
2. Bundesliga managers
German football managers
SC Paderborn 07 managers
UEFA Champions League winning players
UEFA Men's Player of the Year Award winners
West German footballers
German expatriate sportspeople in Qatar